Vila Nova is a neighborhood located in the northwest of the city Joinville, Santa Catarina (state), Brazil. It is famous because of the plantations of rice.

Neighbourhoods in Joinville